Aminul Karim (born 1 July 1955) is a retired lieutenant general of Bangladesh Army. He served as the military secretary to the president of Bangladesh, Iajuddin Ahmed. He was a senior research fellow at the Asia Europe Institute, University of Malaya.

Early life and education 
Aminul Karim was born on 1 July 1955 in Ranibari, Chandpur, Shibganj in Chapainawabganj. His father's name was Momtaz Uddin Ahmed and mother's was Rizia Khatun. He passed SSC in 1972 and HSC in 1974 from Rajshahi Cadet College. He graduated from University of Dhaka in 1980. He completed his staff course in 1985 from the Armed Forces Staff College, Kuala Lumpur. He completed the Long Defense Management course ( Masters in Management Studies) in 1992 from the College of Defense Management affiliated to Osmania University in Secunderabad, India. In 1994, he obtained his Post Graduate (MSS--political science) degree from the Faculty of Social Sciences, University of Dhaka. He graduated from the National University in 1995 with a master's degree in defense studies. He completed the Executive Program (Conflict Management) course in 2000 from the Harvard Kennedy School. In 2001, he completed the National Defense Course (M Phil) from the National Defense College. He completed a Senior Executive Program Course in 2003 from the Near East South Asia Center for Strategic Studies from the National Defense University, Washington, D.C.. He was awarded PhD degree by University of Dhaka in 2007 on his dissertation on Chinese Modernization. He has a son and a daughter.

Career 
Aminul Karim was commissioned in Bangladesh Army as an officer in 1975 in the Regiment of Artillery. He commanded two field units and two field brigades including one independent brigade. He commanded a unit in the Chittagong Hill Tracts in counterinsurgency role. He worked as brigade major in an independent brigade and a staff officer in the military operations directorate at Army Headquarters. Aminul was a faculty member of Defense Services Command and Staff College from 1992 to 1995. From 2001 to 2002, he served as a faculty member at the National Defense College, training senior military and civilian officials in defense and senior management of national security. From 2002 to 2003, he served as the Quartermaster General of the Bangladesh Army. He served as the Adjutant General of the Bangladesh Army in 2004. From 2004 to 2005 he served as the General Officer Commanding of an Army Division of the Bangladesh Army. 

He served as Commandant of the Defense Services Command and Staff College from 2005 to 2006. From 2006 to 2008, he served as the Military Secretary to the President of Bangladesh,  (with the rank of Secretary to the Government of Bangladesh). From 2003 to 2004 as Major General of the Bangladesh Army and from 2008 to 2009 as Lieutenant General worked as Commandant of the National Defense College affiliated with the Bangladesh University of Professionals. He retired from the Bangladesh Army on March 12, 2009. 

After retirement from Bangladesh Army he started his academic career in the University of Malaya as a senior research fellow/ Adjunct Professor. He was a visiting professor at China Foreign Affairs University, Beijing and a visiting scholar at Ohio State University, USA.  He  authored and co-authored many high impact factor academic Journal publications and Books, and a good number of book chapters including one in Nature. These are mostly sole-authored. He has 20 Clarivate-indexed journal publications to his credit till date. He is a member of Southeast and South Asia Clarivate Researchers Forum. He is a semantic scholar. He is also a member of Asian Peace movement organized by National University of Singapore. He is a member of International Political Science Association, attending three of its Research Committees, also being on one of its boards. He is now a member of Asiatic Society of Bangladesh, a top think-tank. He is a founding member of CARES, another think tank for scientific research and innovation.  

He is a member of Rotary Club of Dhaka Central, Dhaka Club Limited, Retired Armed Forces Welfare Association Club, United Nations Association of Bangladesh, and Old Rajshahi Cadets' Association.

He also worked as the vice-chairman and director of Trust Bank Limited, chairman, Sena Kalyan Sangstha, chairman, Radisson Water Garden Hotel, Dhaka, and chairman of Governing Body of all Bangladesh Cadet Colleges. He is a founding director of Green Care Agro Limited (GCAL), dedicated to ameliorate the socioeconomic condition of the local people, through tea production in the Panchagarh district.  He is a founding member of Ziauddin Mondol Foundation at his ancestral  village Ranibari for social works.

Books 
Notable books published by Aminul include:

 Contemporary Security Issues in the Asia-Pacific and Bangladesh
 Selected Papers on Security and Leadership
 Power Politics in the Asia-Pacific : The Case of Chinese Modernization 
 21st Century High Politics in the Indo-Pacific and the Bay of Bengal (Countries and Cultures of the World)
 Geopolitics of the South China Sea in the Coming Decades
 Chinese Military Modernization - Implications for the Region, Monograph Published by Bangladesh Institute of Law and International Affair  
 Genocide and Geopolitics of the Rohingya Crisis
 Is China Encircling India?
 What to know about Supply Chain Management 
 "Ethnicity and Geopolitics of Rohingya Crisis", in Risks, Identity and Conflict, Theoretical Perspectives and Case Studies
“Political Culture and Institution-building Impacting Civil-Military Relations (CMR) in Bangladesh”, a chapter published in a book titled Guns & Roses: Comparative Civil-Military Relations in the Changing Security Environment
“The Power Political Balancing: The Case of Chinese Military Modernization” a book chapter under publication by Chinese Academy of Social Sciences
‘Impact of Microcredit on Socioeconomic Empowerment of Farmers and Agricultural Output in Bangladesh”, Project underway as a book chapter by Springer/ Nature

His journal publications appear in Springer, Nature, Wiley, Cambridge, Routledge, Taylor and Francis, Pal grave McMillan etc.

References 

Living people
1955 births
Bangladesh Army generals
Bangladeshi military personnel
People from Chapai Nawabganj district
University of Dhaka alumni
Harvard Kennedy School alumni
National University, Bangladesh alumni
Rajshahi Cadet College alumni
National Defense University alumni
National Defense College alumni
Bangladesh University of Professionals alumni
Bangladeshi male writers
National Defence College (Bangladesh) alumni